The 40th King's Cup finals was held in Nakhon Ratchasima, Thailand from 17 January until 23 January. The King's Cup is an international football competition held in Thailand. This edition featured four teams and reverted to a round robin group stage.

Sweden was initially due to take part in the competition but later withdrew, thus being replaced by North Korea, who also later withdrew. They were replaced by Singapore. The tournament was moved to the North East of Thailand for the first time as the Thai Football Association continue to promote the game around the country. Denmark and Poland, the other two invitees, were represented by the Danish League XI and Polish League XI select squads.

Venue

Participating nations
  Denmark
  Poland
  Singapore
  Thailand

Matches

Winner

Scorers
2 goals

  Rajko Lekic
  Søren Rieks
  Robert Lewandowski
  Patryk Małecki

1 goal

  Johan Absalonsen
  Jesper Bech
  Martin Bernburg
  Jim Larsen
  Jakob Poulsen
  Morten Rasmussen
  Mikkel Thygesen
  Kamil Glik
  Maciej Iwański
  Piotr Brożek
  Tomasz Nowak
  Sławomir Peszko
  Marcin Robak
  Fazrul Nawaz
  Shi Jiayi
  Sutee Suksomkit
  Therdsak Chaiman

External links
 Kadra w Bangkoku PZPN.PL

King's Cup
King